Kaarene Noelle Fitzgerald,  (12 December 1944 – 24 May 2003) was an Australian advocate for the study and treatment of Sudden Infant Death.
Fitzgerald founded the Sudden Infant Death Research Foundation (known as SIDS & Kids) on 11 July 1977. The organization began the day after her son Glenn died from an unexplainable death, known as a Sudden Infant Death.

This was the first NGO of its kind in Australia. In 1999 she was appointed Companion of the Order of Australia for her services to the community and for "coordination of world-wide efforts to develop and research educational strategies to reduce sudden infant death in infancy".

She was responsible for the development of a direct referral system involving the Foundation, the Health Department, State Coroner's office, Ambulance Service and hospitals.
In 1988, Fitzgerald established Red Nose Day as a fundraising activity and convinced other state based SIDS bodies to join the fundraising activity. It became a signature national fundraising "day" in Australia.

Internationally, Fitzgerald co-founded SIDS International and was the inaugural executive and then chairman of the group from 1989 - 1992. She then developed a network of research coordination - the Global Strategy Task Force.

In 1991 Fitzgerald was approached to help establish the Monash Research Foundation for Reproduction and Development. This group became the Ritchie Centre. Fitzgerald's commitment to research was honored with the Ritchie Centre's annual Kaarene Fitzgerald public forum.

Fitzgerald was born in Te Kuiti, New Zealand and died in Melbourne, Australia on 24 May 2003, after a long battle with cancer. She was survived by her four children, Karl, Anita, Lacey & Michael.

Awards 

 Bowater Scott Achievement Award 1982
 Australian Jaycees Five Outstanding Young Australians (Victorian Award 1983,  Australian Award 1983)
 Companion of the Order of Australia, Australia Day Honours List, 1999  
 Avon-Woman’s Day Spirit of Achievement Award 1999 
 Australian of the Year Awards 2000 - one of five Australian Achievers.

References

1944 births
2003 deaths
Australian activists
Deaths from cancer in Victoria (Australia)
Companions of the Order of Australia
New Zealand emigrants to Australia
People from Te Kūiti